Gorguts is a Canadian death metal band from Sherbrooke, Quebec, formed in 1989. The band has been through many personnel changes since its inception; its only constant member has been guitarist and vocalist Luc Lemay, who remains the primary creative force in the band. To date they have released five full-length albums and one EP. Their most recent release is the EP Pleiades' Dust, released on May 13, 2016. Their latest full-length album Colored Sands was released in 2013 and was nominated for a Juno Award. Musically the band is known for its complex, musically dense form of technical death metal, and has become "one of the most advanced, experimental, and challenging groups in the entire genre."

History

Formation, Considered Dead, and The Erosion of Sanity (1989–1993)
Gorguts was formed in 1989 by Luc Lemay (vocals and guitar), Sylvain Marcoux (guitar), Éric Giguère (bass guitar) and Stephane Provencher (drums); the band name was suggested by one of Provencher's friends. They released their first demo, ...And Then Comes Lividity, in 1990 which led them to be signed to Roadrunner Records. Their first album, Considered Dead, had guest appearances by James Murphy (a guitar solo on "Inoculated Life") and Chris Barnes (backing vocals on "Bodily Corrupted", "Rottenatomy" and "Hematological Allergy").

In 1993, they released their second album The Erosion of Sanity, which was more experimental and technical than Considered Dead. However, this coincided with the decline of death metal's popularity as a genre, and Roadrunner Records subsequently decided to drop the band from their roster. The band ceased performing for five years, with many fans believing that they had broken up.

Obscura, From Wisdom to Hate, MacDonald's death and break-up (1998–2005)
In fact, the writing for the following album had been completed by the end of 1993, but due to a lack of label interest the release of the album was severely delayed. Lemay, the only remaining original member, returned in 1998 on Olympic Recordings with a new line-up consisting of Steeve Hurdle (guitar), Steve Cloutier (bass guitar) and Patrick Robert (drums). Under this lineup they released their third full-length album, Obscura, which has come to be regarded as "one of the most pungently progressive albums ever made, in or out of metal."

After Obscura, Hurdle left and was replaced by Dan Mongrain of the technical death band Martyr, and Robert was replaced by Steve MacDonald on drums. Gorguts' next album, From Wisdom to Hate, was released in 2001. This album is stylistically a mix between the earlier albums and Obscura. Lemay, the primary songwriter on the album, experimented more with the use of sounds, rather than notes, in riffs, such as the opening riff of the album, on the song "Inverted" which uses a combination of pick-slides, pick tapping and traditional picking.

Steve MacDonald, who had a history of recurrent depression, committed suicide in 2002, which eventually led to the split-up of Gorguts in 2005. In an interview, Lemay said that "When I decided to end the band in 2002 or 2003...after Steve MacDonald passed away, I was done with music and I wanted to devote myself to woodworking full time. I was very happy with all the achievements that the band accomplished so it was all good for me.....no bitterness and no feeling of unfinished business." Lemay moved away from Montreal, "because I was done living there. I wanted to be closer to where I was raised and be closer to nature in a way. After Steve's death I wasn't interested in playing music anymore. I was very content with the musical legacy of the band at that point and I was ready to start a new chapter in my life."

Reformation and Colored Sands (2008–2014)

In 2006, Steeve Hurdle asked Lemay to join Hurdle's band Negativa. Lemay accepted "on the condition that everything would be low key. It was all about having fun playing music for me. After a rehearsal Steeve pointed out that it would be cool to make a new Gorguts record to commemorate Gorguts' 20 years of existence. I was all for it and from that point the idea came to play with John (Longstreth – drums), Kevin (Hufnagel – guitar) and Colin (Marston – bass) and create a new record."

In December 2008, a Gorguts demo track with guitar and programmed drums surfaced online, and Lemay himself confirmed an upcoming reunion with Colin Marston, Kevin Hufnagel and John Longstreth. While the new Gorguts had been performing live and writing new material, Lemay said that the band would not be recording until "late fall" 2010 with a release date some time in 2011; In May 2012, Steeve Hurdle died from post-surgical complications. Legal issues surrounding the band's previous contract to Olympic Records delayed the release of the album. Olympic were taken over by Century Media, and Lemay wanted to renegotiate the band's contract. "They agreed to, but in the end we didn't see eye to eye on things and we mutually agreed it was better to go our separate ways. Dissolving the contract was a very time consuming and complicated legal affair."

The band signed to Season of Mist and revealed that its forthcoming album would be titled Colored Sands, which was released on August 30, 2013. Inspired by Opeth and the album The Incident by Porcupine Tree, Lemay intended to write more progressive songs with longer running times and increased dynamics. The classical piece "The Battle of Chamdo" was written by Lemay on piano and recorded with a string quintet. Colored Sands was nominated for a Juno Award.

Pleiades' Dust (2014–2019) 
John Longstreth, whose schedule with Origin was incompatible with Gorguts, departed the band in 2014. His replacement was Patrice Hamelin, who had been performing live with Gorguts since 2011. Lemay announced that Gorguts was working on a new album that would consist of one long song. Pleiades' Dust, the resulting EP, was released on May 13, 2016. It is a concept album about the House of Wisdom in Baghdad during Europe's Dark Ages, and is the band's first recording with Hamelin.

On July 25, 2016, the band announced that they would be touring North America in October 2016 with Intronaut and Brain Tentacles in support of Pleiades' Dust. Following this tour, Gorguts entered another period of relative inactivity.

Upcoming album (2020–present) 
On June 29, 2020, Luc Lemay announced that Gorguts was returning from yet another hiatus and was beginning work on a new album.

Musical style and legacy 

Gorguts' style of metal has evolved considerably since the formation of the band, evolving from a relatively straightforward death metal sound into an increasingly complex style of avant-garde technical death metal. More recently, the band's music is characterised by technically demanding, structurally complex songwriting, with strong use of dissonant and atonal guitarwork. Luc Lemay has noted the influence of Opeth, Deathspell Omega, and Porcupine Tree on his more recent songwriting.

The band's early music, particularly their debut album Considered Dead in 1991, is characterised by a relatively straightforward death metal sound, with conventional instrumentation and song structures. Lemay credits Swedish death metal band Entombed as a major influence on this album. However, on their second album The Erosion of Sanity in 1993, the band began to experiment more, incorporating pianos and acoustic guitars into their sound. The band took a break after this album but reformed with a new lineup and released Obscura in 1998. Obscura represented a significant shift in the band's style of music, often attributed to then-guitarist Steeve Hurdle. The album made increasing use of complex song structures, unorthodox sounds, dissonant guitarwork, unconventional time signatures, and esoteric lyrical themes. "Even by today's standards Obscura is considered to be one of the most complex and technical records in the genre, due to its unprecedented dissonance and experimentation brought by the band's late guitarist Steeve Hurdle."  The following album, 2001's From Wisdom to Hate, represents a balance between Obscura and the previous album The Erosion of Sanity. The complexity and unpredictability of the song structures were scaled back, while still incorporating technically complex compositions, leading to a slightly more streamlined sound. The band's next album, 2013's Colored Sands, represents a significant evolution in this style of metal, with critics noting that the "huge wall of dissonant lead work and dizzying rhythm riffs have been crafted into something far more atmospheric, but with the heaviness and weight only Gorguts could take to this level, making Colored Sands not only near-immaculately put together, but perhaps one of the most absorbing albums of their genre."

Gorguts' influence on metal has been extensive. They are routinely credited as being key pioneers in the use of dissonance and atonality in metal. They are considered key influences on a range of bands, including Ulcerate, Spawn of Possession, Obscura, Beyond Creation, and many others. Obscura is named after the Gorguts album of the same name.

Members

Current
 Luc Lemay – vocals, guitar (1989–2005, 2008–present)
 Kevin Hufnagel – guitar (2009–present)
 Colin Marston – bass guitar (2009–present)
 Patrice Hamelin – drums (2014–present)

Former
 Carlo Gozzi – bass guitar (1989) 
 Gary Chouinard – guitar (1989–1990)
 Sylvain Marcoux – guitar (1990–1993)
 Stephane Provencher – drums (1989–1993)
 Éric Giguère – bass guitar (1990–1993)
 Steve MacDonald – drums (1993–1995, 1998–2002; died 2002)
 Steeve Hurdle – guitar, vocals (1993–1999; died 2012)
 Steve Cloutier – bass guitar (1993–2004)
 Patrick Robert – drums (1996–1998)
 Dan Mongrain – guitar (1999–2001)
 John Longstreth – drums (2009–2014)

Timeline

Discography

Studio albums
Considered Dead (1991)
The Erosion of Sanity (1993)
Obscura (1998)
From Wisdom to Hate (2001)
Colored Sands (2013)

EPs
Pleiades' Dust (2016)

Compilations
Demo Anthology (2003)

Live albums
Live in Rotterdam (2006)

Demos
'89 Demo (1989)
...And Then Comes Lividity (1990)

References

External links

Canadian technical death metal musical groups
Canadian progressive metal musical groups
Avant-garde metal musical groups
Musical groups established in 1989
Musical groups disestablished in 2005
Musical groups reestablished in 2008
Musical groups from Sherbrooke
Roadrunner Records artists
Season of Mist artists
1989 establishments in Quebec
2005 disestablishments in Quebec
2008 establishments in Quebec